Victor Teodorescu (born 1925) is a Romanian modern pentathlete. He competed at the 1956 Summer Olympics.

References

External links
 

1925 births
Possibly living people
Romanian male modern pentathletes
Olympic modern pentathletes of Romania
Modern pentathletes at the 1956 Summer Olympics